Maria Teresa Saenz Surita (born 14 August 1956) is a Brazilian politician who is the mayor of Boa Vista, Roraima and a former Federal Deputy from 1990 to 1992 and from 2011 to 2012. Surita is dedicated to issues of social policy and human rights of children and adolescents.

Surita holds a bachelor's degree in tourism.

She also served as National Secretary of Urban Policies of the Ministry of Cities 2009–2010, in the cabinet of President Luiz Inácio Lula da Silva.

Federal Deputy

Member of the 54ª Legislature of the Chamber of Deputies, Teresa Surita is presently:

 Vice Leader of the Brazilian Democratic Movement Party - PMDB
 First Vice-President of the Special Committee of the National Education Plan 
 Vice-President of the Parliamentary Joint Committee on Human Rights of the Child and Adolescent
 Member of the Commission of Social and Family
 Member of the Board of Advanced Studies and Technology Assessment 
 Rapporteur of the Special Commission for examination of the Bill 7.672/2010  for a child education without use of corporal punishment. Substitute report substitute passed in the House of Representatives, known as "Anti-Spanking Law"
 Holder of the Special Committee to examine the Bill 7.420/2006 (The Educational Accountability Act)
 Holder of the Special Committee to examine the PL 8.035/2010 - National Education Plan 2011/2015 
 Holder of the Special Committee to examine the PL 1.610/1996 - Exploration of Mineral Resources on Indigenous Lands 
 Alternate member of the Commission on Human Rights and Minorities
 Alternate member of the Urban Development Commission
 Councillor of Board of Directors of the Congressional Joint Municipal and Support for Mayors and Vice Mayors of Brazil
 Member of Young Brazilian Parliament
 Member of the Parliamentary Commission of Inquiry into Human Trafficking in Brazil
 Member of the Parliamentary Commission of Inquiry into the Sexual Exploitation of Children and Adolescents
 2nd Vice-President of the Special Committee for consideration of the PEC111/2011 on the workers of the former Territories

Articles
 Atenção às terras raras. O Globo, 24/04/2012. 
 Terras-raras: dormindo em berço esplêndido. Correio Braziliense,  28/03/2012. 
 Crianças e adolescentes, sujeitos de direitos. Folha de S.Paulo, 13/12/2011. 
 Acabar com a cultura da violência. Antes tarde do que nunca. Correio Braziliense, 02/11/2011. 
 Um basta à violência. Correio Braziliense, 10/09/2011. 
 Copa do Mundo e salvaguardas sociais. Correio Braziliense, 17/08/2011. 
 Salto de paraquedas na Barra do Vento. Blog Teresa Surita, 25/08/2010. 
 Política com o coração. Blog Teresa Surita, 04/08/2010. 
 Vencendo desafios: mergulhando em cavernas. Blog Teresa Surita, 11/07/2010. 
 É possível recuperar jovens em situação de risco. Blog Teresa Surita, 03/05/2010. 
  As muitas vítimas da violência juvenil. Blog Teresa Surita, 30/05/2010. 
 Mutirão contra a violência. Folha de Boa Vista, 25/03/2010. 
 Um pouco da minha história. Blog Teresa Surita, 22/03/2010.

See also
 List of mayors of Boa Vista, Roraima

References

External links
 Teresa Surita Blog 
 Teresa Twitter 
 Teresa Surita page - Facebook 
 Congresswoman Teresa Surita Home Page at Portal da Câmara

|-

|-

1956 births
Living people
People from São Manuel
Women mayors of places in Brazil
Mayors of places in Brazil
Members of the Chamber of Deputies (Brazil) from Roraima
Brazilian Democratic Movement politicians